Valerie Christine Parv  (1951 – 25 April 2021) was a popular Australian writer of over 70 romance novels, with more than 34 million sales. She published her novels in Mills & Boon's since 1982.

Biography
Valerie married Paul Parv, who was a crocodile hunter in the tropical north of Australia. They lived for some years in Sydney. Her husband became a cartoonist, and they moved to the capital city, Canberra. They were married for 38 years prior to her husband's death in 2008.

Valerie published her first novels in 1982. She was recognised as a media spokesperson for all things romantic in Australia.

Awards and honours

Parv was an Australia Day Ambassador for the National Australia Day Council from 2006. She has also been awarded the Romantic Times Book Reviews New York Pioneer of Romance Award.

In 2015 Parv was made a member of the Order of Australia for "significant service to the arts as a prolific author, and as a role model and mentor to young emerging writers".

Bibliography

Single Novels

Baby Chase Series
The Billionaire's Baby Chase (1997)
Baby Wishes and Bachelor Kisses (1998)

Carramer Crown Series

Carramer Crown Sub-Series
The Monarch's Son (2000)
The Prince's Bride-To-Be (2000)
The Princess's Proposal (2000)

Carramer Legacy Sub-Series
Crowns and a Cradle (2002)
The Baron and the Bodyguard (2002)
The Marquis and the Mother-To-Be (2002)

Carramer Trust Sub-Series
The Viscount and the Virgin (2003)
The Princess and the Masked Man (2003)
The Prince and the Marriage Pact (2003)
Operation: Monarch (2004)

Code of the Outback Series
Deadly Intent (2004)
Heir to Danger (2004)
Live to Tell (2004)

Beacon Series
1. Birthright (2012)
1.5. Starfound (2016)
2. Earthbound (2016)
2.5. Continuum (2016)
3. Homeworld (2016)

Fabulous Fathers Series Multi-Author
The Billionaire's Baby Chase (1997)

Royally Wed Series Multi-Author
Code Name: Prince (2001)

Older Man Multi-Author
Booties and the Beast (2001)

Romancing the Crown Series Multi-Author
Royal Spy (2002)

Collections
Forget Me Not (2006)

Omnibus In Collaboration
To Wed a Royal (2002) (with Carla Cassidy)
Operation – Monarch / Bulletproof Bride (2004) (with Diana Duncan)
Shotgun Honeymoon / Heir to Danger (2004) (with Terese Ramin)
Live to Tell / Racing Against the Clock (2004) (with Lori Wilde)
Dangerous Memories / Deadly Intent (2005) (with Barbara Colley)

Non fiction
The changing face of Australia: The impact of 200 years of change on our environment (1984)
The Art of Romance Writing: How to Create, Write And Sell Your Contemporary Romance Novel (1993)
The Idea Factory: A Guide to More Creative Thinking And Writing (1996)
34 million books: Australia's Queen of Romance Shares Her Life and Writing Tips (2020)

References

Resources
Valerie Parv's Official Website
Harlequin Enterprises Ltd's Website
Valerie Parv's Webpage in Fantastic Fiction's Website

1951 births
2021 deaths
Australian romantic fiction writers
Australian women novelists
Women romantic fiction writers
Members of the Order of Australia
Writers from Sydney
People from Canberra